Algeria (ALG) competed at the 1983 Mediterranean Games in Casablanca, Morocco.

Medal summary

Medal table

References

International Mediterranean Games Committee

Nations at the 1983 Mediterranean Games
1983
Mediterranean Games